Contraband is an album by Dutch rock band Golden Earring, released in 1976 in Europe and 1977 in the US.

For the US, the album was re-titled Mad Love and the track "Faded Jeans" was omitted and replaced with "I Need Love".

Track listing
All songs written by Hay and Kooymans.

European track listing
"Bombay" – 3:52
"Sueleen" – 5:40
"Con Man" – 7:10
"Mad Love's Comin'" – 7:45
"Fighting Windmills" – 4:38
"Faded Jeans" – 5:07
"Time's Up" – 3:52

USA track listing

Side A
"I Need Love" - 6:23
"Sueleen (Sweden)" - 5:50
"Mad Love's Comin'" - 7:44

Side B
"Bombay" - 3:51
"Fightin' Windmills" - 4:39
"Con Man" - 7:09
"Time's Up" - 3:55

Personnel
 Barry Hay - vocals
 George Kooymans - guitar, vocals
 Eelco Gelling - guitar, slide guitar
 Rinus Gerritsen - bass, keyboards
 Cesar Zuiderwijk - drums
Additional personnel
Patricia Paay - vocals
 Robert Jan Stips - piano (track 6), mini Moog (track 3)
Nippy Noya - percussion, congas

Production
Producers: Golden Earring, John Kriek, Damon Lyon-Shaw
Engineer: Robin Freeman
Mixing: John Kriek, Steve Lillywhite, Damon Lyon-Shaw
Cutting engineer: Melvyn Abrahams
String arrangements: Robert Jan Stips
Coordination: Jan Vermaes
Art direction: Koos Van Oostrom
Artwork: Koos Van Oostrom

Charts

References

Golden Earring albums
1976 albums
Polydor Records albums